Lough Atedaun is a freshwater lake in the Mid-West Region of Ireland. It is located in The Burren of County Clare.

Geography

Hydrology
Lough Atedaun lies along the River Fergus which flows in from neighbouring Inchiquin Lough. Nearby Lough Cullaun also flows in to Lough Atedaun. The lake is highly eutrophic.

Natural history
Fish species in Lough Atedaun include perch, rudd, pike, stone loach and the critically endangered European eel. The lake is part of the East Burren Complex Special Area of Conservation. It is also part of the Corofin Wetlands Special Protection Area.

See also
List of loughs in Ireland

References

Atedaun